In Greek mythology, Helenus (Ancient Greek: Ἕλενος Helenos) was the name of the following characters:

 Helenus, a son of Zeus and Lysithea, daughter of Evenus.
Helenus, a prophet, and son of King Priam and Queen Hecuba of Troy.
 Helenus, son of Oenops and an Achaean warrior who participated in the Trojan War. During the siege of Troy, he was killed by Hector and Ares.
 Helenus, one of the Suitors of Penelope from Ithaca along with 11 other wooers. He, with the other suitors, was killed by Odysseus with the assistance of Eumaeus, Philoetius, and Telemachus.

Notes

References 

 Apollodorus, The Library with an English translation by Sir James George Frazer, F.B.A., F.R.S. in 2 Volumes, Cambridge, MA, Harvard University Press; London, William Heinemann Ltd. 1921. . Online version at the Perseus Digital Library. Greek text available from the same website.
 Homer, The Iliad with an English Translation by A.T. Murray, Ph.D. in two volumes. Cambridge, MA., Harvard University Press; London, William Heinemann, Ltd. 1924. . Online version at the Perseus Digital Library.
 Homer, Homeri Opera in five volumes. Oxford, Oxford University Press. 1920. . Greek text available at the Perseus Digital Library.
Pseudo-Clement, Recognitions from Ante-Nicene Library Volume 8, translated by Smith, Rev. Thomas. T. & T. Clark, Edinburgh. 1867. Online version at theio.com

Children of Zeus
Demigods in classical mythology
Achaeans (Homer)
Suitors of Penelope
Ithacan characters in Greek mythology